Archipatrobus is a genus of ground beetles in the family Carabidae. There are at least three described species in Archipatrobus.

Species
These three species belong to the genus Archipatrobus:
 Archipatrobus deuvei Zamotajlov, 1992  (China)
 Archipatrobus flavipes (Motschulsky, 1864)  (Eastern Asia)
 Archipatrobus suensoni (Zamotajlov & Kryzhanovskij, 1990)  (China)

References

Carabidae